The 2002 WCT Players' Championship was held February 27 to March 3 at the Strathroy Gemini Sportsplex in Strathroy, Ontario. It was the final Grand Slam event of the 2001-02 World Curling Tour season.

The total purse for the event was $150,000. The winning rink would be the Wayne Middaugh team from Midland, Ontario which beat Winnipeg's Vic Peters in the final.

Teams entered
 Dave Boehmer
 Kerry Burtnyk
 Pierre Charette
 Glen Despins
 Bert Gretzinger
 Warren Hassall
 Glenn Howard
 Stefan Karnusian
 Bruce Korte
 Allan Lyburn
 William Lyburn
 Kevin Martin
 Greg McAulay
 Chad McMullan
 Wayne Middaugh
 Rich Moffatt
 David Mundell
 Kevin Park
 Vic Peters
 Ralph Stöckli
 Jeff Stoughton

Playoffs

References

External links
CurlingZone - Results

Players Championship, 2002
Strathroy-Caradoc
Curling in Ontario
Players' Championship
2002 in Ontario